Eugene Anthony "Red" Sheridan (November 14, 1896 – November 25, 1975) was an American professional baseball player who played in five games at second base and shortstop for the Brooklyn Robins in 1918 and 1920.

External links

1896 births
1975 deaths
Major League Baseball second basemen
Major League Baseball shortstops
Brooklyn Robins players
Baseball players from New York (state)
Reading Coal Barons players
Reading Marines players
New Orleans Pelicans (baseball) players
Buffalo Bisons (minor league) players
Newark Bears (IL) players
Jersey City Skeeters players
Hartford Senators players
Pittsfield Hillies players
New Haven Profs players
Bridgeport Bears (baseball) players
Burials at Long Island National Cemetery